The Needles are a distinctive group of rock pinnacles, mountain peaks adjacent to the Topock Gorge, and the Colorado River on the northwestern extreme of the Mohave Mountains within the Havasu National Wildlife Refuge in Mohave County, Arizona, United States.  They range from 1207 to over 1600 feet in altitude.

References

External links

Landforms of Mohave County, Arizona
Mountains of Arizona
Mountains of Mohave County, Arizona